Eva Fabian (born August 3, 1993) is an American-Israeli open water swimmer. She was the 2010 world champion in the 5-kilometer swim, and won a gold medal at the 2015 Pan American Games in the women's 10k.

Early life
Fabian was born in Frederick, Maryland, to Claire (a doctor) and Jack (a professor and swim coach) Fabian.  She has an older brother, Max.  Her hometown is Keene, New Hampshire, and she was homeschooled.  She attended Yale University, majoring in music, and graduated in 2016. She lives in Netanya, Israel.

Swimming career
Her coaches are Jack Fabian, her father, who coached diving at Keene State College, and Hanan Gilad.

United States

At the 2009 World Aquatics Championships in Rome, Italy, Fabian placed 10th in the 25-kilometer open water event. At the 2009 Open Water National Championships she won the 5K and came in second in the 10K.

At the 2010 FINA World Open Water Swimming Championships, Fabian won a gold medal in the 5-kilometer swim in 1:02:00.98 in Lac Saint-Jean, Canada, at 16 years of age. In the 10 km, she was disqualified along with Brazil's Poliana Okimoto for failing to round a turn buoy properly.  At the 2010 Pan Pacific Swimming Championships, Fabian won a silver medal behind Christine Jennings in the 10-kilometer open water event.

At the 2011 Pan American Games in Guadalajara, Mexico, Fabian placed fourth in the 25-kilometer open water event, only two seconds out of third place. At the 2011 USA Swimming Open Water National Championships she won the gold medal in the 10K in 2:18:31.

In 2013 she won bronze medals at the National Championships in the 10K, and at the FINA World Aquatics Championships in Barcelona, Spain, in the 25K with a time of 5:07:20.4.

In 2014 she won a bronze medal at the 2014 US Open Water National Championships in the 10K, and a silver medal at the 2014 Pan Pacific Swimming Championships in Gold Coast, Queensland, Australia, in the 10K.

She won a gold medal at the 2015 Pan American Games in Toronto, Canada, in the women's marathon 10k in 2:03:17.0. She missed most of the 2016 season due to injury.

Israel
Fabian immigrated to Israel, and became an Israeli citizen in 2017.  She lives and trains at Wingate Institute. In December 2017 she won a silver medal at the Israel National Short Course Swimming Championships in the 400 m freestyle, with a time of 4:15.74. She represented Israel at the 2019 World Aquatics Championships in Gwangju, South Korea.

References

External links
 
 
 "Video Interview: Yale's Eva Fabian on Open Water, Ivy League Swimming" at SwimSwam
 "Eva Fabian: Open Letter To FINA Over Wetsuit Rules" at SwimSwam
 

1993 births
Living people
American long-distance swimmers
Israeli female swimmers
Female long-distance swimmers
Sportspeople from Frederick, Maryland
People from Keene, New Hampshire
People from Netanya
Swimmers at the 2011 Pan American Games
Swimmers at the 2015 Pan American Games
Yale Bulldogs women's swimmers
Wingate Institute alumni
World Aquatics Championships medalists in open water swimming
Pan American Games gold medalists for the United States
Pan American Games medalists in swimming
Medalists at the 2015 Pan American Games